St. Paul's Catholic College  (formerly named Christian Brothers College, Manly) is a diocesan Catholic secondary day school for boys, located in , on the Northern Beaches of Sydney, New South Wales, Australia. The college was founded by the Congregation of Christian Brothers in 1929, and since 1982 has been conducted by lay staff appointed by the Diocese of Broken Bay.

As a regional secondary school, St Paul's provides for the boys of the Catholic parishes of Manly Freshwater (including Curl Curl, Fairlight, Freshwater, Manly), North Harbour (including Allambie, Balgowlah, Clontarf, Manly Vale, Seaforth), and Warringah (including Beacon Hill, Brookvale, Cromer, Dee Why, and Narraweena).

History  

St Paul's College owes its origins to Monsignor John MacDonald, Parish Priest of Manly. In 1924 Monsignor MacDonald made a request for Christian Brothers to open and run a school for boys on the northern beaches. The Brothers were renowned throughout the British Isles and Empire for providing a good education in the Catholic tradition for boys from poor families. "No boy," they had long said, "would be excluded from the school because of the inability or unwillingness of his parents or guardians to pay school fees." The Congregation responded by sending four Brothers: T. N. Bourke, P. B. Costello, H. F. Gygar, and T. P. O'Connor, who established their monastery and school in Manly, next to the Parish Church in Raglan Street. Christian Brothers' Manly opened on 29 January 1929 and welcomed 123 students, a great undertaking for four Brothers.

The school doubled in size in just four years, with 250 boys enrolled in 1933. The Second World War was the catalyst for the establishment of the Cadet Corps, which was later disbanded in 1962. Other long-standing features of school life included football, cricket, swimming, athletics, boxing, wrestling tournaments, and annual dramatic and musical concerts. The boys' choirs sang for Sunday Mass and afternoon Benediction at Mary Immaculate Church, Manly.

The Archbishop of Sydney, Cardinal Gilroy, moved the college in 1965 from Raglan Street to its present site on Manly's Eastern Hill, in the grounds of St Patrick's Estate. The new college buildings cost A£125,000. These were added to in the 1970s, and included science laboratories paid for by some of the first Commonwealth Government funding for private schools. The Cardinal's Palace, on the same land as the college, hosted Year 12 classes in the dining room; since 2005 the Cardinal's Palace has been wholly used by the college for its administration, leadership, and staff centre. To these buildings the Waterford Centre was added in 2015, which boasts views of Sydney's Middle Harbour and a large multi-purpose space for sport and assembly.

In 1982 Brian Mayne was appointed the first lay Principal of the college. There have been seven lay Principals: Messrs Brian Mayne, Kenneth Doyle, Andrew Martin, Christopher Comerford, Mark Baker, Christopher Browne (2017-2020), and Michael Reid (since 2021).

Traditions 

The College Year begins with Mass, usually celebrated at Mary Immaculate Church, Manly, in which parish the college was founded and is situated. The local Catholic clergy provide chaplaincy services and liturgical support.

Assemblies throughout the year commemorate religious festivals and special occasions: Ash Wednesday and Lent, ANZAC Day, Holy Week and Easter, Remembrance Day, Advent and Christmas. Students and staff together raise funds for charitable purposes: Project Compassion, Catholic Mission, Society of St Vincent de Paul.

The Dux of the college and other prize-winners are recognised at the annual Year in Review. The college awards a number of trophies, plates, and cups to high achieving sportsmen.

Support for the college and community spirit are generated by the Parents' and Friends' Association.

College crest 

The shield of the college displays the Cross of Christ, the proudly-borne standard of the loyal and resilient disciple of Jesus. The Celtic form of the Cross hearkens back to the foundation of the college by the Christian Brothers, who were themselves founded by an Irishman, Edmund Ignatius Rice. The star stands for the Blessed Virgin Mary, specially invoked locally under her title "Star of the Sea" in honour of the unfailing guidance and direction she gives to travellers and pilgrims. The colours are also deeply symbolic: in heraldry, red is often associated with zeal and courage, and black with luxuriance - together, the colours speak of the hope of every member of the college for personal success, which comes through hard striving in all circumstances. The shield is laid on an open scroll which bears the name of the college patron, St Paul the Apostle, and the motto, Prima Primum (First things first).

Motto 

The Latin motto of the college, Prima Primum (First things first), is a challenge to students to order wisely life's competing priorities. To live well, a St Paul's boy will not allow himself to be swamped by the many and varied claims on his time and talents, but will instead be inspired to search among them for the one thing which is necessary and reorder all else under and around it. Once having found God, the St Paul's boy will see clearly what comes next, and what can next be taken up without losing the greater, more important.

Curriculum 

These subjects are undertaken by Year 7 students: Geography, History, English, Mathematics, Music, PDHPE, Religious Education, Science, Sport, Technology, and Visual Arts.

Co-curriculum 

The college has a long tradition of cultural engagement and sporting achievement, which it sustains by a high degree of student participation.
 Cultural: chess
 Musical: concert band, instrumental ensembles
 Service: social justice and outreach, youth ministry
 Sports: Australian rules football, athletics, basketball, beach volleyball, cricket, cross country, golf, lawn bowls, rugby league, rugby union, soccer, surfing, swimming, touch football, water polo

Notable alumni 

Media, entertainment, and the arts
 Joey BizingerYouTube personality and musician
 Ryan Kwantenfilm and television actor
 Baz Luhrmannfilm director, screenwriter, and producer
 Matthew Nablefilm and television actor, author, and former NRL player for Manly Warringah and South Sydney
 Paul Verhoevenbroadcaster, writer, blogger and comedian

Politics, public service, and the law
 Alex McTaggartNorthern Beaches Councillor, former Mayor of Pittwater and Member of Parliament

Sport
 Phil Blakerugby coach for Leicester Tigers, former rugby league player for Manly Warringah
 Adam Cuthbertsonrugby league player for Leeds, Manly Warringah, Cronulla, St George Illawarra, and Newcastle
 Oliver DaviesAustralian cricketer
 Sam Hallwinter Olympian skier at Sochi 2014
 Nathan Hedgeprofessional surfer
 Adam Nableformer rugby league player for Manly Warringah, Wakefield Trinity, Balmain, Wests Tigers, North Queensland, and New York Knights
 Chris Neroformer rugby league player for St George Illawarra, Huddersfield, Salford City, and Bradford
 Shannon Nevinformer rugby league player for Manly Warringah, and founder of "Walk 'n' Talk" for suicide prevention
 Calem Nieuwenhofsoccer player for Sydney FC
 Brad Parkerrugby league player for Manly Warringah Sea Eagles
 Chad Randallformer rugby league player for Manly Warringah, and former Super League player for London Broncos 
 Aaron Trinderrugby league player for Northern Devils, formerly Manly Warringah, North Sydney, and Halifax

See also 

 List of Catholic schools in New South Wales
 Catholic education in Australia

References 

Boys' schools in New South Wales
Educational institutions established in 1929
Manly, New South Wales
Private schools Northern Beaches Sydney
Catholic secondary schools in Sydney
1929 establishments in Australia
Roman Catholic Diocese of Broken Bay
Former Congregation of Christian Brothers schools in Australia